Finnish Church may refer to:

 Evangelical Lutheran Church of Finland, a national church of Finland
 Finnish Church, Stockholm, a church building in Stockholm, Sweden